St Florence (Welsh: Sain Fflwrens) is both a village, a parish and a community in Pembrokeshire, Wales. St Florence sits on the River Ritec that flows  eastwards to its estuary in Tenby. The Church of St Florence is a grade II* listed building.

In 2001, the population was 490 (2001 Census Settlement data), 650 (2001 Census Community Council 993Ha) and 751 (Parish Headcount).

History
St Florence dates back to Norman times and remains of 16th and 17th-century buildings still exist, with Flemish chimneys, characteristic of Pembrokeshire, in evidence, named after Flemish settlers in the region. The river was navigable by small vessels as far upstream as St Florence until the 19th century when it silted up as a result of local land reclamation. The village is a noted stop on the Tenby to Whitland section of the Cistercian Way owing to its historical significance.

St Florence Church (St. Florentius) 
The 12th-century parish church is dedicated to St Florentius; it was restored in the 19th century, and is a grade II* listed building. In the church is a memorial to Robert Ferrar, the Protestant Bishop of St Davids, who was burned at the stake at Carmarthen during the reign of Mary in 1555.

Geography
St Florence sits on the River Ritec that flows eastwards to its estuary in Tenby. East of St Florence on the north bank of the river is Ritec Fen, a Site of Special Scientific Interest (SSSI).

Public Transport
Bus Service 361 Edwards Coaches(Route: Pembroke Dock - Tenby)(As at 2016), nearest train station - Manorbier 

Sport and leisure activities
St Florence's football side were the Pembrokeshire Division 3 Cup champions of the season 2006/2007. The village hosts an annual Duck Race on the river at Easter for charity.

To the north of the village on the B4318 is Manor House Wildlife Park. Other local attractions include Heatherton World of Activities and The Dinosaur Park.

References

External links
Historical information and sources on GENUKI

Villages in Pembrokeshire
Communities in Pembrokeshire